Jacob Morenga, also Jakob, Jacobus, Marengo, and Marenga, known as the "black Napoleon", (1875 – 20 September 1907) was an important figure in Namibia, then the German colony of German South West Africa. He was chief leader in the insurrection against the German Empire which took place between 1904 and 1908, and was best known for forging an alliance between the rival Herero and Namaqua tribes.

Morenga/Marengo was born to a Herero mother and Nama father and was educated by Christian missionaries and worked as a mineworker in South Africa. 

Before the Herero and Namaqua War of 1904–1907, Morenga had participated in smaller, more localized insurrections which were taking place across German South West Africa. Through these, Morenga (Morenga means Kings in Otjiherero) proved himself to be an able tactician. However, it was through his three years of leadership of the anti-German guerrilla forces that Morenga gained the majority of his reputation. It often proved difficult for Morenga to maintain proper control of his armies, as their preferred methods of attack differed fundamentally. The Herero sought direct and open combat with German forces, while the Namaqua preferred more guerrilla-like tactics. The group under Morenga planned their attacks from the hidden fortress of ǁKhauxaǃnas in southern Namibia. 

Captain Paul von Lettow-Vorbeck played a major role in the German pursuit of Jacob Morenga. During a 1906 gunfight against Morenga and his men, Captain von Lettow-Vorbeck suffered injuries to his left eye, which was left blind, and his chest.

The diverse and widely successful methods of attack used by Morenga's forces were enough to force a special election in the German Reichstag, due to the relatively heavy losses suffered by German troops.

After more than 50 battles against German troops, Morenga was captured and imprisoned by South African police. However, he was released a short time later under the condition that he never return to German South West Africa again. Despite this, he again ventured into German South West Africa by crossing the Orange River. He soon began the task of assembling an army of native peoples to once again attack German troops. He gathered together the now-dispersed tribes of the Herero, Namaqua, and Witboois, leading them into battle against the German colonial empire.

Morenga gained a reputation within both the Schutztruppe and the Imperial German Army as a military genius and a noble and worthy opponent, who further received the nickname, "the Black Napoleon". In May 1906, after the climactic Battle of Rooysvlei, Morenga was again forced to leave German South West Africa, fleeing to South Africa. He retreated into the Kalahari desert, where he planned further insurrections against German troops. However, Morenga was traced through cooperation between German troops and South African police, and was eventually shot and killed in a battle between his forces and the combined German and South African forces on 20 September 1907 at Eenzaamheid.

Recognition
Jacob Morenga is one of nine national heroes of Namibia that were identified at the inauguration of the country's Heroes' Acre near Windhoek. Founding president Sam Nujoma remarked in his inauguration speech on 26 August 2002 that:
Born of a Herero mother and a Nama father, Marenga had a vision of broad African nationalism which transcended narrow ethnic loyalties and he was therefore designated as 'the man of the future'. He employed scientific guerilla tactics with the multi-ethnic troops under his command and engaged the German colonial army in more than fifty battles. [...] To his revolutionary spirit and his visionary memory we humbly offer our honor and respect.
Morenga is honoured in form of a granite tombstone with his name engraved and his portrait plastered onto the slab. A statue of Morenga is situated at the cemetery of Warmbad in the far South of Namibia. Jakob Marengo Secondary School and Tutorial College in Windhoek's Khomasdal suburb is named after him.

In popular culture
In 20th century German literature, Uwe Timm's 1973 novel Morenga revolves around Jacob Morenga's uprising.

References

1875 births
1907 deaths
Namibian rebels
Colonial people in German South West Africa
Herero people
National heroes of Namibia
Nama people
Namibian military personnel